Margarete Charlotte Moos (née Jacoby; 9 December 1909 – 3 January 2008) was a German-born politically active poet and playwright.

Early life
Daughter of Samuel and Luise Jacoby, she was born in Berlin on 9 December 1909. She soon showed her talent as a writer, when, in 1919, her essay on eastern European refugees was published in the Berliner Tageblatt and she was thanked personally by the editor, Theodor Wolff. After a brief period at the school of the Berlin State Theatre she worked as assistant to a photographer and then in the Workers' Theatre. Here she met left-wing economist Siegfried Moos, "Siege", whom she married in 1932.

Emigration and travels
After Hitler's rise to power in 1933 it was necessary for Lotte and Siege to flee Germany, and initially they settled in Paris, but soon moved to London.  Lotte's ambition to study at LSE was frustrated by the fact that her German qualifications were not recognised. In 1936 the British government refused to renew her visa and she departed for the Soviet Union to join her Irish lover, Brian Goold-Verschoyle, and "to see what it was like". She soon became disillusioned with Stalinism and succeeded in returning to Britain. The British authorities received 'information' from the Soviet defector Walter Krivitsky that she could be a spy, and she was arrested and interrogated by MI5 in Holloway Prison. She then was interned as an enemy alien on the Isle of Man.

Oxford and Durham
On release from internment she rejoined her husband in Oxford, where he was working at the Institute of Statistics under William Beveridge. Lotte worked as a nursemaid, translator, typist and teacher, and under the pseudonym Maria Lehmann, she also wrote a column for a London-based German-language Exilliteratur newspaper, Die Zeitung.
Shortly after the war ended Siege was appointed as a lecturer at Durham University, and the family, now with a baby daughter, moved to Durham. There Lotte took part in amateur dramatics and also wrote plays, still using the "Maria Lehmann" name. In May 1964 her play Come Back With Diamonds, a comedy about a released political prisoner returning to Moscow, was performed at the Lyric Theatre, Hammersmith.

London
In 1966, Siegfried became an adviser to the Board of Trade, and he and Lotte moved to Hackney in London. Both of them wrote poetry at this time, and Lotte had three collections published. Some of her work also appeared in the anthology The New British Poetry (1988).
Siegfried died in 1988; Lotte died on 3 January 2008 in London. Their daughter Merilyn has written a biography of her father, which includes her search for the fate of her mother's Jewish parents in Germany under the Nazis.

Published poetry

References

Further reading
 Moos, Merilyn (2010). The Language of Silence. Cressida Press. 
 Moos, Merilyn (2014). Beaten But Not Defeated. Chronos Books. 
 

1909 births
2008 deaths
20th-century English poets
20th-century English women writers
English-language poets
English women poets
Exilliteratur writers
German emigrants to England
Jewish emigrants from Nazi Germany to the United Kingdom
People interned in the Isle of Man during World War II
Writers from Berlin